Meander Glacier is a large meandering tributary to Mariner Glacier in Victoria Land, Antarctica. The glacier emerges in the vicinity of Mount Supernal and Hobbie Ridge and drains generally eastward for  through the Mountaineer Range to join Mariner Glacier just east of Engberg Bluff. The descriptive name was given by the New Zealand Geological Survey Antarctic Expedition, 1962–63.

See also
Mount Kinet

References

Glaciers of Victoria Land
Borchgrevink Coast